Aporomyces is a genus of fungi in the family Laboulbeniaceae. The genus contain 8 species.

See also
List of Laboulbeniaceae genera

References

Laboulbeniomycetes
Laboulbeniales genera